Bulbophyllum porphyrostachys is a species of plant in the family Orchidaceae. It is found in Cameroon, the Republic of the Congo, and Nigeria. It was botanically described in 1951.

Although the distribution of B. porphyrostachys is widespread; from Southern Nigeria (in Okuma, Sapoba and Usonigbe Forest Reserves, and in Calabar) to Cameroon (specifically on Mount Cameroon) and Congo-Brazzaville; it is found only sporadically, as either an epiphyte, or a lithophyte (on lava rock). It has not been observed as the latter recently (1995 survey).

Sources

External links 
Five photos of B. porphyrostachys

porphyrostachys
Near threatened plants
Plants described in 1951
Orchids of Cameroon
Orchids of Nigeria
Flora of the Republic of the Congo
Epiphytic orchids
Taxonomy articles created by Polbot